A Witness Tree is a collection of poems by Robert Frost, most of which are short lyric, first published in 1942 by Henry Holt and Company in New York. The collection was awarded the Pulitzer Prize for Poetry in 1943.

Background
This collection was published after several unfortunate tragedies had occurred in Frost's personal life, including his daughter Marjorie's death in 1934, his wife's death in 1938, and his son Carol's suicide in 1940. Despite these losses, Frost continued to work on his poetry and eventually fell in love with his secretary Kay Marrison, who became the primary inspiration of the love poems in this collection. This collection is the last of Frost's books that demonstrates the seamless lyric quality of his earlier poems. The most popular poem of this volume is "The Gift Outright", a patriotic poem that was recited at the presidential inauguration of John F. Kennedy in 1961.

Contents
Beech	9
Sycamore	9
ONE OR TWO

1	The Silken Tent	13
2	All Revelation	14
3	Happiness Makes Up in Height for What It Lacks in Length	15
4	Come In	16
5	I Could Give All to Time	17
6	Carpe Diem	18
7	The Wind and the Rain	20
8	The Most of It	23
9	Never Again Would Birds’ Song Be the Same	24
10	The Subverted Flower	25
11	Wilful Homing	28
12	A Cloud Shadow	29
13	The Quest of the Purple-Fringed	30
14	The Discovery of the Madeiras	32
TWO OR MORE

1	The Gift Outright	41
2	Triple Bronze	42
3	Our Hold on the Planet	43
4	To a Young Wretch (Boethian)	44
5	The Lesson for Today	46
TIME OUT

1	Time Out	55
2	To a Moth Seen in Winter	56
3	A Considerable Speck (Microscopic)	57
4	The Lost Follower	59
5	November	61
6	The Rabbit Hunter	62
7	A Loose Mountain (Telescopic)	63
8	It Is Almost the Year Two Thousand	64
QUANTULA

1	In a Poem	67
2	On Our Sympathy with the Under Dog	68
3	A Question	69
4	Boeotian	70
5	The Secret Sits	71
6	An Equalizer	72
7	A Semi-Revolution	73
8	Assurance	74
9	An Answer	75
OVER BACK

1	Trespass	79
2	A Nature Note	80
3	Of the Stones of the Place	81
4	Not of School Age	82
5	A Serious Step Lightly Taken	84
6	The Literate Farmer and the	Planet Venus	86

See also
 The Witness Tree

References

External links
 

1942 poetry books
1942 poems
1940s poems
Poetry by Robert Frost
American poetry collections
Pulitzer Prize for Poetry-winning works
Works by Robert Frost